Meherpur-1 is a constituency represented in the Jatiya Sangsad (National Parliament) of Bangladesh since 2014 by Farhad Hossain of the Awami League.

Boundaries 
The constituency encompasses Meherpur Sadar and Mujibnagar upazilas.

History 
The constituency was created in 1984 from the Kushtia-5 constituency when the former Kushtia District was split into three districts: Meherpur, Kushtia, and Chuadanga.

Members of Parliament

Elections

Elections in the 2010s

Elections in the 2000s 

Ahmed Ali died in office. Abdul Mannan of the Awami League was elected in a May 1999 by-election.

Elections in the 1990s

References

External links
 

Parliamentary constituencies in Bangladesh
Meherpur District